In geography, a bank is the land alongside a body of water. Different structures are referred to as banks in different fields of geography, as follows.

In limnology (the study of inland waters), a stream bank or river bank is the terrain alongside the bed of a river, creek, or stream. The bank consists of the sides of the channel, between which the flow is confined. Stream banks are of particular interest in fluvial geography, which studies the processes associated with rivers and streams and the deposits and landforms created by them. Bankfull discharge is a discharge  great enough to fill the channel and overtop the banks.

The descriptive terms left bank and right bank refer to the perspective of an observer looking downstream; a well-known example of this being the sections of Paris as defined by the river Seine. The shoreline of ponds, swamps, estuaries, reservoirs, or lakes are also of interest in limnology and are sometimes referred to as banks. The grade of all these banks or shorelines can vary from vertical to a shallow slope.

In freshwater ecology, banks are of interest as the location of riparian habitats. Riparian zones occur along upland and lowland river and stream beds. The ecology around and depending on a marsh, swamp, slough, or estuary, sometimes called a bank, is likewise studied in freshwater ecology.

Banks are also of interest in navigation, where the term can refer either to a barrier island or a submerged plateau, such as an ocean bank. A barrier island is a long narrow island composed of sand and forming a barrier between an island lagoon or sound and the ocean. A submerged plateau is a relatively flat topped elevation of the sea floor at shallow depth — generally less than  — typically on the continental shelf or near an island.

See also
 Coast
 Embankment (earthworks)
 Levee

References

Hydrology
Geomorphology
Limnology
Freshwater ecology
Fluvial landforms
Riparian zone
Rivers
Water streams
Water and the environment

de:Ufer